The following is a list of pipeline accidents in the United States in 2022. It is one of several lists of U.S. pipeline accidents. See also list of natural gas and oil production accidents in the United States.

Incidents 
This is not a complete list of all pipeline accidents. For natural gas alone, the Pipeline and Hazardous Materials Safety Administration (PHMSA), a United States Department of Transportation agency, has collected data on more than 3,200 accidents deemed serious or significant since 1987.

A "significant incident" results in any of the following consequences:

 fatality or injury requiring in-patient hospitalization
 $50,000 or more in total costs, measured in 1984 dollars
 liquid releases of five or more barrels (42 US gal/barrel)
 releases resulting in an unintentional fire or explosion

PHMSA and the National Transportation Safety Board (NTSB) post incident data, and results of investigations, into accidents involving pipelines that carry a variety of products, including natural gas, oil, diesel fuel, gasoline, kerosene, jet fuel, carbon dioxide, and other substances. Occasionally pipelines are repurposed to carry different products.

 On February 22, a Southern Natural Gas 18 inch pipeline exploded and burned, in Perry County, Alabama. A 5 foot long section of pipe was ejected 72 feet away. There were no injuries.
 On February 22, residents in Lawrenceville, Georgia reported to a local gas company a gas smell. This led to finding diesel fuel running into a storm drain from a leaking Products Pipe Line 26 inch line. It was unknown how long the pipeline had been leaking.
 On March 11, Woodpat Pipeline, a 22-inch-diameter hazardous liquids pipeline operated by Marathon Pipe Line LLC (Marathon Petroleum), ruptured in Edwardsville, Illinois. The rupture resulted in the release of about 164,000 gallons of crude oil, some of which entered Cahokia Creek, a tributary of the Mississippi River. No injuries occurred, and the crude oil did not ignite.
  On June 29, Energy Transfer Partner’s Mid Valley Pipeline ruptured when a secondary party damaged the transmission pipeline carrying crude oil, in Henderson, Tennessee. The damage resulted in the discharge of approximately 4,800 barrels of crude, equivalent to 201,600 gallons into the surrounding area, including a local creek.
 On September 20, a contractor's digging equipment hit & ruptured a crude oil gathering pipeline in Williams County, North Dakota, spilling about 8,400 gallons of crude oil.
 On December 7, the Keystone Pipeline leaked about 588,000 gallons of tar sands crude into a creek, in Washington County, Kansas. This is the biggest oil spill in Keystone Pipeline history.

References

Lists of pipeline accidents in the United States
2022 disasters in the United States